Stephanie Dinkins (born 1964) is a transdisciplinary American artist based in Brooklyn, New York. She is known for creating art about artificial intelligence (AI) as it intersects race, gender, and history.

Her aim is to "create a unique culturally attuned AI entity in collaboration with coders, engineers and in close consultation with local communities of color that reflects and is empowered to work toward the goals of its community."

Dinkins is best known for her projects, Conversations with Bina48, a series of conversations between Dinkins and the first social, artificially intelligent humanoid robot BINA48 who looks like a black woman and Not the Only One, a multigenerational artificially intelligent memoir trained off of three generations of Dinkins's family.

Early life and education 
Dinkins was born in Perth Amboy, New Jersey to Black American parents who raised her in Staten Island, New York. She credits her grandmother with teaching her how to think about art as a social practice, saying "my grandmother . . . was a gardener and the garden was her art . . . that was a community practice."

Dinkins attended the International Center of Photography School in 1995, where she completed the general studies in photography certificate program. Dinkins received a MFA in photography from the Maryland Institute College of Art in 1997 She completed the Independent Study Program at the Whitney Museum of American Art in 1998.

Career 
Dinkins is an associate professor in the art department at Stony Brook University.

Activism 
Dinkins advocates for co-creation within a social practice art framework, so that vulnerable communities understand how to use technology to their advantage, instead of being subjected to their use. This is exemplified in her works such as Project al-Khwarzmi, a series of workshops entitled PAK POP-UP at the nonprofit community center Recess in Brooklyn, NY. The workshops involved collaborating with youth in the criminal justice system and uplifting the voices of vulnerable communities in determining how technologies are created and utilized. Dinkins warns of the dangers to members of minority groups that are absent from the creation of the computer algorithms that now affect their lives.

Art 
Dinkins's practice employs technologies including, but not limited to, new media such as artificial intelligence and machine learning. Dinkins uses oral history techniques of interviewing to craft community-authored narratives and databases which inform the subjects of her work and serve as acts of social intervention or protest.

Conversations with Bina48 (2014-present) 
Conversations with Bina48 is a series of recorded conversations with BINA48, a social robot that resembles a middle-aged black woman. Dinkins mirrors Bina48 while they discuss identity and technological singularity.

In 2010, Hanson Robotics, an engineering and robotics company known for its development of humanoid robots, developed and released BINA48. Bina48 is a robot modeled after the memories, beliefs, attitudes, commentary and mannerisms of Bina Aspen Rothblatt, the spousal partner of Martine Rothblatt. Both Bina and Martine Rothblatt own Bina48 under their organization, the Terasem Movement Foundation.

Five years after Bina48 was released, Dinkins came across a YouTube video of Bina48. She asked, "how did a black woman become the most advanced of the technologies at the time?" Her questioning led her to travel to Lincoln, Vermont (the site of the Terasem Movement Foundation) where she conducted a series of interviews with Bina48 and engaged the robot in conversations pertaining to race, intimacy and the nature of being.

The conversations suggest opportunities for complementing human existence with artificially intelligent agents that have an identity and history, but also show artificial intelligence's current limitations. Although it is based on a black woman, Dinkins found that Bina48 was shaped by the biases of its white, male creators.

Project al Kwarizmi (PAK) (2017-present) 
Project al Kwarizmi (PAK) was a series of pop up workshops in Brooklyn, NY at Eyebeam and Recess; Manhattan, New York at Google; and Durham, North Carolina at Duke University. The workshops were centered for "communities of color that use art as a vehicle to help citizens understand how algorithms, the artificially intelligent systems they underpin, and big data impact their lives and empowers them to do something about it. Project al-Khwarizmi uses art and aesthetics as the common language to help citizens understand what algorithms and artificial intelligent systems are, and where these systems already impact our daily lives."

Not the Only One (N'TOO) (2018-present) 
Not the only one (N’TOO) is a voice-interactive chatbot that was trained with data from members of her family to tell a multi-generational story. Dinkins described Not The Only One (NTOO or N'TOO) as an "experimental" multigenerational memoir of one Black American family told from the "mind" of an artificial intelligence of evolving intellect. N'TOO uses a recursive neural network, a deep learning algorithm. It is a voice-interactive AI robot designed, trained, and aligned with the needs and ideals of black and brown people who are drastically underrepresented in the tech sector. NTOO can also be described as a "physically embodied artificially intelligent agent that senses and acts on its world."

Exhibitions 
Dinkins's work is exhibited internationally at various public, private, community, and institutional venues, including the Whitney Museum of American Art, the de Young Museum, the Philadelphia Museum of Art, the Studio Museum in Harlem;, Museum of Contemporary Photography, the Long Island Museum of American Art, History, and Carriages,  the International Center of Photography in New York, Herning Kunstmuseum in Herning, Denmark, The Barbican in London, UK,  Islip Art Museum, Wave Hill, Taller Boricua, the Queens Museum, and the corner of Putnam and Malcolm X Blvd in Bedford Stuyvesant, Brooklyn, New York. She has presented her work in symposia at the Museum of Modern Art, amongst other venues.

Awards and recognition 
Dinkins is the recipient of many awards, including: a Berggruen Institute artist fellowship; a Sundance New Frontiers Story Lab fellowship; a Soros Equality Fellowship; a Lucas Artists fellowship; a Creative Capital grant; a Bell Labs artist residency; a Blade of Grass fellowship; and a Data & Society fellowship. She is a 2019 Creative Capital awardee.

Media coverage 
Dinkins appeared in episode six of the HBO television series Random Acts of Flyness directed by Terence Nance, where she described her conversations with BINA48.

References

Further reading

External links 
 Stephanie Dinkins website
 Artist bio by MoMA R&D
 Artist profile by AI Artists
 Stony Brook University faculty page

Artists from Brooklyn
Artificial intelligence art
Artificial intelligence researchers
African-American women artists
People from Perth Amboy, New Jersey
Artists from New Jersey
Living people
Maryland Institute College of Art alumni
People from Staten Island
Stony Brook University faculty
21st-century American women artists
1964 births
American women academics
21st-century African-American women
21st-century African-American artists
20th-century African-American people
20th-century African-American women